The following lists events that happened during 1849 in Australia.

Incumbents

Governors
Governors of the Australian colonies:
Governor of New South Wales – Sir Charles Augustus FitzRoy
Governor of South Australia – Sir Henry Fox Young
Governor of Tasmania – Sir William Denison
Governor of Western Australia as a Crown Colony – Captain Charles Fitzgerald

Events
 26 January – The Australasian Anti-Transportation League is formed during a public meeting at Launceston, Tasmania; later branches were formed in Adelaide, Melbourne, Sydney, and Canterbury (New Zealand).
 23 February – Public meeting in Perth calls for introduction of convicts to the help the colony's depressed economy, first consignment arrive in the following June.

Births

 18 January – Sir Edmund Barton, 1st Prime Minister of Australia and inaugural High Court justice (d. 1920)
 11 February – Fred Bamford, Queensland politician (d. 1934)
 26 March – Edwin Evans, cricketer (d. 1921)
 27 July – Archibald Watson, surgeon (d. 1940)
 8 August – Hume Nisbet, novelist and artist (born in the United Kingdom) (d. 1923)
 17 August – William Kidston, 17th Premier of Queensland (born in the United Kingdom) (d. 1919)
 29 August – Sir John Sulman, architect (born in the United Kingdom) (d. 1934)
 22 September – Alexander Forrest, Western Australian politician and explorer (d. 1901)
 24 September – Justin Foxton, Queensland politician (d. 1916)
 5 November – Sir Lancelot Stirling, South Australian politician (d. 1932)
 2 December – Frank Allan, cricketer (d. 1917)
 28 December – Dugald Thomson, New South Wales politician (born in the United Kingdom) (d. 1922)

References

 
Australia
Years of the 19th century in Australia